The Senni Beds is the former name of the Senni Formation in Wales. It preserves fossils dating back to the Devonian period.

See also

 List of fossiliferous stratigraphic units in Wales

References
 
 

Geologic formations of Wales
Devonian System of Europe
Devonian Wales